The men's 100 kg weightlifting competitions at the 1984 Summer Olympics in Los Angeles took place on 6 August at the Albert Gersten Pavilion. It was the second appearance of the heavyweight I class.

Results

References

Weightlifting at the 1984 Summer Olympics